Superhero is a live album by singer/comedian Stephen Lynch. "Priest", "Mother's Day" and "Lullaby (The Divorce Song)" were originally recorded on his first CD A Little Bit Special. It was recorded live at four different comedy clubs in New York and New Jersey. Along with A Little Bit Special and The Craig Machine, the album has sold over 250,000 copies.

His second official album, Superhero, released in 2002, with What Are Records?, generally received better reviews than the first, partly because of strong audience response. The title track is 8 minutes and 58 seconds long, and largely consists of Lynch receiving the audience's suggestions for names for superheroes.

Track listing

A bonus live version of the song "Special Olympics" is included at about 5:40 into "Lullaby" (after a period of silence between the two songs), and was likely hidden there to avoid controversy over the title and content of the song.

Personnel

Stephen Lynch – guitar, vocals
Mark Teich – vocals

Marc Stedman – recording, mixing
Travis Leonard – assistant engineering
Franziska Kunze – assistant engineering
Dan Kocen – assistant engineering
Joe Lambert – mastering
C.F.G. Design – artwork
Danny Miller – photography

References

Stephen Lynch (musician) albums
Live comedy albums
2003 live albums
2000s comedy albums